The following lists the top 25 singles of 2013 in Australia from the Australian Recording Industry Association (ARIA) end-of-year singles chart.

"Call Me Maybe" by Carly Rae Jepsen was the biggest song of the year, peaking at #1 for 5 weeks.

References

Australian record charts
2012 in Australian music
Australia Top 25 Singles